Ozan Baris, previously known as Ozan Colak, (born March 31, 2004) is an American tennis player.

Baris has a career high ATP singles ranking of 1254 achieved on June 20, 2022. He also has a career high ATP doubles ranking of 1232 achieved on August 8, 2022.

Baris won the 2022 US Open – Boys' doubles title with Nishesh Basavareddy. Baris plays college tennis at Michigan State University.

Junior Grand Slam titles

Doubles: 1 (1 title)

References

External links

2004 births
Living people
American male tennis players
Sportspeople from Kalamazoo, Michigan
US Open (tennis) junior champions
Michigan State Spartans men's tennis players
Grand Slam (tennis) champions in boys' doubles
21st-century American people
Tennis people from Michigan